The Roman Catholic Diocese of Radom is a diocese located in the city of Radom in the Ecclesiastical province of Częstochowa in Poland.

History
 March 25, 1992: Established as Diocese of Radom from the Diocese of Sandomierz – Radom

Special churches
Minor Basilicas:
 Bazylika św. Filipa Neri i św. Jana Chrzciciela kk. Filipinów (Basilica of St. Philip Neri and St. John the Baptist) in Studzianna
 Bazylika św. Kazimierza (Basilica of St. Casimir), Radom

Leadership
 Bishops of Radom (Roman rite)
 Bishop Edward Henryk Materski (25 March 1992 – 28 June 1999)
 Bishop Jan Chrapek, C.S.M.A. (28 June 1999 – 18 October 2001)
 Bishop Zygmunt Zimowski (28 March 2002 – 18 April 2009)
 Bishop Henryk Tomasik (16 October 2009 – 04 January 2020)
 Bishop Marek Solarczyk (appointed 04 January 2021)

 Auxiliary bishops of Radom
Bishop Adam Odzimek

See also
Roman Catholicism in Poland

Sources
 GCatholic.org
 Catholic Hierarchy
 Diocese website

Roman Catholic dioceses in Poland
Roman Catholic Diocese of Radom
Christian organizations established in 1992
Roman Catholic Diocese of Radom
Roman Catholic dioceses and prelatures established in the 20th century